Sandanski (Bulgarian: Сандански [sɐnˈdanski]) is a town in Bulgaria. Sandanski may also refer to
Sandanski Municipality in Bulgaria
Yane Sandanski (1872–1915), Macedonian Bulgarian revolutionary
Sandanski Point in Antarctica named after Yane Sadanski
Jane Sandanski Arena in North Macedonia named after Yane Sadanski
Yanko Sandanski (born 1988), Bulgarian football midfielder